Evelyn Mae Ward (May 21, 1923 – December 23, 2012) was an American actress known from her stage musical performances and television appearances. Her son was the actor-singer David Cassidy.

Background
Ward was born and raised in West Orange, New Jersey, the daughter of Frederick and Ethel Laurinda (née Wheeler) Ward. Her ancestors were among the founders of Newark, New Jersey.

Career
Ward began her performing career as a teenager dancing with the Roxyettes at the Roxy Theater. After understudying Mary Martin in the musical Dancing in the Streets, which closed "out of town" in the spring of 1943, Ward made her Broadway debut that summer in the musical Early to Bed. Her subsequent Broadway musical credits include The Firebrand of Florence (1945), Spring in Brazil (1945), Billion Dollar Baby (1946), and Along Fifth Avenue (1949).

Her subsequent theatrical credits were mostly in regional theater, but she did return to the Broadway musical stage in the spring of 1958, replacing Gwen Verdon in the  lead role in New Girl in Town. In 1967, Ward appeared in the play And So to Bed at the LA Theater Center and her son David Cassidy also was featured in the cast. In 1996, she left retirement to co-star in Such a Pretty Face.

She also performed in nightclubs in New York City and Boston, and in 1954 performed in a Las Vegas revue.

In 1949, Ward was a regular on the CBS game show Hold It Please, and in 1950–1951, she was a regular on the ABC variety series The College Bowl (also known as The Chico Marx Show). Her other television credits include Man from U.N.C.L.E., Ben Casey, Dr. Kildare, Perry Mason, Mike Hammer, The Further Adventures of Ellery Queen, and Hallmark Hall of Fame.

Personal life
Ward married actor Jack Cassidy on June 28, 1948: the couple had met in 1945 while appearing in the Broadway musical The Firebrand of Florence.  Ward and Cassidy had one son, David Bruce Cassidy, born on April 12, 1950. The family resided in Ward's native West Orange. The marriage of Jack Cassidy and Evelyn Ward ended in a Mexican divorce in July 1956.

In August 1956, Cassidy married actress Shirley Jones, with whom he had been romantically involved since the previous summer. According to Jones, Cassidy and Ward had been separated twice and then got back together prior to her meeting Cassidy, and their marriage had remained rocky.

After her divorce from Cassidy, Ward and the couple's son resided with Ward's parents in West Orange until 1961, when Ward married film director Elliot Silverstein.

Ward had known Silverstein for several years, as she had acted in Boston-area stage productions directed by Silverstein in 1955 and 1957. Ward and Silverstein divorced in 1968. Ward is sometimes mistaken as the onetime wife of film director Norman Z. McLeod. However, McLeod's wife, also named Evelyn Ward, was born in Iowa between 1900 and 1902. Later, Ward married Al Williams, who died in 2005.

Death
Ward died on December 23, 2012, from complications from dementia. She was survived by her son, David (who died of liver failure on November 21, 2017), and two grandchildren, Katie Cassidy and Beau Cassidy.

References

External links

Actresses from New Jersey
American stage actresses
American television actresses
1923 births
2012 deaths
People from West Orange, New Jersey
20th-century American actresses
Deaths from Alzheimer's disease
Deaths from dementia in California
21st-century American women